These are the squads for the 1999 Korea Cup in South Korea, which took place from 12 June to 19 June 1999. The players' listed age is their age on the tournament's opening day (12 June 1999).

Croatia
Head coach: Miroslav Blažević

Egypt
Head coach: Mahmoud El-Gohary

South Korea
Head coach: Huh Jung-moo

Mexico
Head coach: Manuel Lapuente

See also
1999 Korea Cup

External links
Korea Cup 1999 at RSSSF

1999 squad